{{Infobox person
| name               = Baker Ahmad Alserhan
| image              = Dr. Baker Ahmad Alserhan.jpg
| alt                = 
| caption            = 
| birth_name         = Baker Ahmad Alserhan
| birth_date         = 
| birth_place        = 
| death_date         = 
| death_place        = 
| nationality        = 
| other_names        = 
| occupation         = Author
| years_active       = 
| known_for          = Author of The Principles of Islamic marketing' and the Chairman of the Global Islamic Marketing Conference (GIMAC)
| notable_works      = * He is the president of the International Islamic Marketing Association (IIMA).
  Chairman of the Global Islamic Marketing Conference (GIMAC).
}}

Baker Ahmad Alserhan is the author of The Principles of Islamic marketing'' He is the president of the International Islamic Marketing Association (IIMA) and the Chairman of the Global Islamic Marketing Conference (GIMAC).

Alserhan founded four academic journals, two of them with Emerald and ‘Inderscience’. He is an active researcher, public speaker, and consultant. His research interests include Islamic marketing and branding, Islamic hospitality, Islamic lifestyles, and Islamic business studies. Alserhan is an associate professor in marketing at Qatar University.

References

Academic staff of Qatar University
Year of birth missing (living people)
Living people
Place of birth missing (living people)
Qatari writers